Paul Rose (born 1951) is a British television presenter who mainly works for the BBC. He is an accomplished diver, mountaineer and explorer whose skills and interests led to his role as a documentary presenter.
Rose made frequent expeditions to Antarctica, supporting scientists engaged in research, and for eight 6-month seasons was base commander of Rothera Research Station.

In 2006, Rose presented the 5-part BBC Four documentary series Voyages of Discovery.

In 2008 he co-presented the 8-part BBC Two documentary series Oceans.

In 2011 he co-presented the 4-part BBC Two documentary series Britain's Secret Seas.

Since the mid 2010s, Paul Rose has been involved with a number of walking documentaries made as part of the BBC's commitment to regional programming. In 2016, his 5-part programme Coastal Path series showed Rose on the 630 mile South West Coast Path, with the series originally broadcast as a regional BBC One show for people in the south west and Channel Islands. Coastal Path would go on to be repeated nationally for viewers on BBC Two in the following  years and would end up as a BBC Four programme, last broadcast on 27 July 2021.

In 2017 Rose presented a 2-part BBC One documentary on the Yorkshire Wolds Way, a walk of around 80 miles from the Humber to Filey, on the North Yorkshire coast. During the programme, Rose explored the wildlife and geographical features of the landscape he encountered. In the second part of the documentary he took a dramatic glider flight from the Wolds Gliding Club, Pocklington, over part of the Wolds Way.

In 2018 he presented the four-part BBC One series The Lakes with Paul Rose, about the English Lake District.

References

External links 
 
 British Antarctic Survey

Living people
British mountain climbers
British television presenters
British underwater divers
Explorers of Antarctica
Recipients of the Polar Medal
1951 births
Recipients of the Royal Geographical Society Founder's Medal